The canton of Séné is an administrative division of the Morbihan department, northwestern France. It was created at the French canton reorganisation which came into effect in March 2015. Its seat is in Séné.

It consists of the following communes:
 
Arzon
Le Hézo
Saint-Armel
Saint-Gildas-de-Rhuys
Sarzeau
Séné
Surzur
Theix-Noyalo
Le Tour-du-Parc
La Trinité-Surzur

References

Cantons of Morbihan